"Who Am I" is the fourth official single by Starboy Nathan, from his second album 3D - Determination, Dedication, Desire. The single was released on 29 April 2012 on digital download. The song charted at number 6 in the UK Indie Chart and number 23 on the UK R&B Chart.

Music video
A music video to accompany the release of "Who Am I" was first released onto YouTube on 13 April 2012, at a total length of three minutes and thirty-eight seconds.

Track listings

Chart performance

Release history

References

2012 singles
2011 songs